Eye of the Eagle is a 1997 Danish medieval adventure film directed by Peter Flinth. Based on an original screenplay by Bjarne O. Henriksen, it takes place in Denmark during 1218. Filming primarily took place at the Asserbo Castle ruins in Denmark, Eilean Donan Castle in Scotland, and Tisvilde Strand at Tisvildeleje in Denmark. The film won five of Denmark's Robert Awards in 1998.

Plot 
War is upon Denmark, and King Valdemar II sends his only son and heir in safety to Eskil, bishop of Ravensburg, who is instructed to educate the prince. As soon as the king leaves the country to go to war, the bishop makes plans about seizing the crown for himself. Accidentally the prince and the kitchen-boy Aske overhear the schemes of Eskil and his conspirators, but are seen and pursued by a one-eyed man, who wants to take revenge on the king for leaving him behind on a battlefield where he lost his eye. The eye was swallowed by an eagle, which he has tamed and now shares his sight with.

Cast 
 Nijas Ørnbak-Fjeldmose as prince Valdemar
 Lasse Baunkilde as kitchen-boy Aske
 Lars Lohmann as king Valdemar
 Björn Granath as bishop Eskil
 Bjørn Floberg as the one-eyed man
 Rasmus Haxen as Morten Trefinger (Threefinger)
 Kristian Halken as Gert Fredløs (the Outlawed)
 Maj Bockhahn Bjerregaard as Signe
 Baard Owe as brother Sune
 Hardy Rafn as brother Grammaticus
 Thorbjørn Hummel as count Albert
 Asger Reher as squire Mikkelsen
 Folmer Rubæk as a squire
 Steen Stig Lommer as a squire
 Lasse Lunderskov as a coachman
 Erik Wedersøe as the voice of the one-eyed man

Production
Filming primarily took place at the Asserbo Castle ruins in Denmark, Eilean Donan Castle in Scotland, and Tisvilde Strand at Tisvildeleje in Denmark.

Awards
The film won five of Denmark's Robert Awards in 1998.
 Best Costume Design (Manon Rasmussen) 
 Best Editing (Morten Giese)
 Best Make-Up (Elisabeth Bukkehave) 
 Best Screenplay (Nikolaj Scherfig) 
 Best Sound (Morten Degnbol and Stig Sparre-Ulrich)

See also
List of historical drama films

References

External links 
 

1997 films
Danish adventure films
1990s adventure films
1990s Danish-language films
Films directed by Peter Flinth
Films set in Denmark
Films set in the 13th century
Films set in the Middle Ages